William Dathan Holbert (born September 12, 1979), also known as Wild Bill, is a self-confessed murderer, and ex-cartel hitman from Hendersonville, North Carolina. He is currently serving a 46-year sentence for the killings of five Americans in Panama.

Early life 
William Dathan Holbert was born on September 12, 1979 in Saluda, North Carolina. Living in the rural mountains of Western North Carolina, Holbert's family owned and managed a small apple orchard and cattle ranch.

Holbert attended high school in the neighboring city of Hendersonville, North Carolina. He played high school football and was elected by his teammates as one of two "field generals" or the defensive captain of the team.

As a student, Holbert was remembered as gifted, but with an unremarkable grade-point average by his teachers. He was also known as a troublemaker. He graduated from North Henderson High School in 1997.

Holbert was cited by a game warden in 1996 when he was 17 for illegally hunting on federal land. He was not arrested but was fined and released, but otherwise had no arrests or convictions as a minor.

Holbert sought an associate degree in agriculture from Blue Ridge Community College.

Political activism 

From 2003 to 2005, Holbert led the Southern National Patriots, a militia and fledgling political party based in Western North Carolina.

The group was a controversial conservative activist organization. Members often were seen in uniform on the streets of Forest City, North Carolina.

At its height, the organization had 500 active members and acquired a meeting house on Main Street in Forrest City, North Carolina.

The group was criticized as being a racist organization in 2005 by the local branch of the NAACP.

Holbert denied this charge, claiming that several of the group's members were African American.

The group collapsed in 2005 when Holbert left the U.S.

Murders 
Prosecutors allege Holbert confessed to killing five expats, two of whom were wanted fugitives  by U.S. authorities, in Panama. Prosecutors say Holbert befriended the victims, shot them in the head, and then buried their bodies.

Holbert contested the prosecutor's version of events of the killings during the investigation and at his trial. He confessed but maintained that all three events were contract killings ordered by cartel associates. When asked for further information he declined to provide details or the names of his accomplices.

Holbert and his ex-girlfriend Laura Michelle Reese were arrested by authorities as they attempted to make their way into Nicaragua via Costa Rica on July 26, 2010.

Holbert now operates and chairs Los Reos Unificados, a syndicated Christian inmate organization, on the national level in the Republic of Panama. Holbert also operates Panama Human Rights, an international human rights organization for prisoners. In September 2014, Holbert's lawyer issued a statement saying that Holbert had been appointed chaplain of the Catholic Church in the Public Jail of David; In February of 2020 Holbert was appointed Pastor and Mediator to the approximately 150 inmates of the super maximum security wing of the most notorious prison in the Republic of Panama, La Joya.

Six years after his confession for the killing of five people in Panama, the Superior Court of the province of Chiriqui in Panama set a trial date for December 5, 2016.

Holbert was sentenced to 46 years on August 14, 2017 for the killings of the five victims in Panama.

Holbert immediately appealed the sentence citing Panama's 20-year maximum penalty at the time of the murders. His appeal was submitted to the Supreme Court on January 11, 2018. The appeal is currently in process in the Supreme Court of the Republic of Panama.

Media coverage
Dateline NBC season 20 episode 7 "Rescue on the Mountainside/Stealing Paradise", original air date October 2010. Kate Snow investigates Cher Hughe, a resident of Panama and her ties to Holbert and Reese's criminal ways.

In 2016, a detailed account of Holbert's crimes written by Nick Foster, The Jolly Roger Social Club: A True Story of a Killer in Paradise, was published.

In January 2019, The Daily Mirror published an exposé on Holbert's supposed existence inside the New Chiriqui Public Prison. The online edition alleged that Holbert enjoys liberal privileges, that he has access to firearms inside the prison, and feasts on fast food daily. It reported on Holbert's status as the leader of various violent gangs, which Holbert defends as Christian groups.

In 2021 Holbert published a controversial memoir about his life in prison called Long Live the King Wild Bill (the hero is a villian). 

Holbert was criticized by the authorities for publishing photos of prison officials in 2015. The prison system of Panama keeps staff members' names private. Holbert, alleging corruption, published photos of several government functionaries. A corruption scandal ensued in the prison system, and several high-level officials of the now-defunct David Public Prison were fired or sanctioned by the government. Holbert did an interview with the Daily Mirror January 15, 2019 outlining the conditions of the Panamanian prison systems.

Prison Chaplain 
In early 2020 Holbert was appointed pastor of the infamous Sector C in the La Joya Prison Complex.

Holbert also acts as the mediator between the various violent gangs of the prison.

See also 
 List of serial killers in the United States

References

Further reading
 Foster, Nick. The Jolly Roger Social 'Club: A True Story of a Killer in Paradise (Gerald Duckworth & Co Ltd, 2016). .

 Holbert, William "Wild Bill" Long Live the King Wild Bill (Stone Jug Inspiration, 2021)

External links
 Crimelibrary

1979 births
American expatriates in Panama
American people convicted of murder
American serial killers
Living people
Male serial killers
People from Hendersonville, North Carolina
Prisoners and detainees of Panama